Khemalda is a rural locality (a village) in Irdomatskoye Rural Settlement, Cherepovetsky District, Vologda Oblast, Russia. The population was 25 as of 2002. There are 2 streets.

Geography 
Vaneyevo is the nearest rural locality.

References 

Rural localities in Cherepovetsky District